Piana Clerico is a traditional clothing company in Biella city, Piedmont, Italy, the family business with tradition from 1582.

The products 
The products include:

 raincoats
 belts
 waistcoats
 blouses
 pullovers
 jackets
 trousers
 skirts
 t-shirts
 sweaters
 underwear
 socks
 gloves
 ties
 scarves
 hats
 shoes
 slippers, etc.

Well-known products are silk and gold yarn ties.

See also 

 Italian fashion
 Made in Italy

References

External links 
Piana Clerico Official website

Clothing brands of Italy
Textile companies of Italy
Fashion accessory brands
High fashion brands
Luxury brands
Companies established in the 16th century
16th-century establishments in Italy